Daniel Lee Melville (born March 4, 1956) is a former American football punter who played one season with the San Francisco 49ers of the National Football League. He first enrolled at Grossmont College before transferring to the University of California, Berkeley. He attended El Capitan High School in Lakeside, California.

References

External links
Just Sports Stats
College stats

Living people
1956 births
Players of American football from San Diego
American football punters
Grossmont Griffins football players
California Golden Bears football players
San Francisco 49ers players